Araneus trifolium, the shamrock orbweaver, is a species of orb weaver in the family Araneidae. It is found throughout the USA and in Canada.
The abdomen of Araneus trifolium can have various colors. Most commonly, it is seen in a beige or brown color. Occasionally, the abdomen of the spider has a greenish touch to the brown color or it may even be yellow or orange. In the latter case, Araneus trifolium is sometimes confused with the orange orb weaver species Araneus marmoreus, also called pumpkin spider. The shamrock spider can be distinguished from other orb weaver species by the several white dots on its back. The legs of Araneus trifolium are usually brown or beige colored with several white bands around the joints. 
The shamrock spider creates a web to catch its prey. Small flying insects who fly into the web will get stuck in the sticky net. The web of an orb weaver can be up to two feet (60cm) in diameter. 
The bite of a shamrock spider can be painful but it is not dangerous for humans with effects comparable to a bee sting.

References

Further reading

 
 
 
 

Araneus
Spiders described in 1847